Robert McLiam Wilson (born Robert Wilson, 24 February 1964)  is a Northern Irish novelist.

Biography
He was born in the New Lodge district of Belfast and then moved to Turf Lodge and other places in the city.

He attended St Malachy's College and studied English at St Catharine's College, Cambridge; however, he dropped out and, for a short time, was homeless. This period of his life profoundly affected his later life and influenced his works.

Wilson moved to Paris where he writes for Charlie Hebdo and Libération. He also writes occasionally for The Guardian, Corriere della Sera and Le Monde.

Work
McLiam Wilson has written three novels:
Ripley Bogle (1989)
Manfred's Pain (1992)
Eureka Street (1996)

Ripley Bogle is a novel about a homeless man in London.

Eureka Street focuses on the lives of two Belfast friends, one Catholic and one Protestant, shortly before and after the IRA ceasefires in 1994. A BBC TV adaptation of Eureka Street was broadcast in 1999.

He is also the author of a non-fiction book about poverty, The Dispossessed (1992), and has made television documentaries for the BBC.

His next novel, Extremists, has been postponed again and again.

Awards
In 2003, he was named by Granta magazine as one of 20 "Best of Young British Novelists", despite the fact that he has not published new work in English since 1996.

"Ripley Bogle" won the Rooney Prize and the Hughes Prize in 1989, and a Betty Trask Award and the Irish Book Awards in 1990.

References

External links
 Collection of Wilson's columns and articles in Charlie Hebdo (In English).
 The scurrilous lies written about Charlie Hebdo, The Guardian
 The solace of an Australian summer when cricket brought hope and light, The Guardian

1964 births
Living people
Male novelists from Northern Ireland
Writers from Belfast
People educated at St Malachy's College
Alumni of St Catharine's College, Cambridge
Charlie Hebdo people